Ozma may refer to:


Fictional characters 
 Princess Ozma, ruler of the fictional land of Oz
 Ozma Lee, in Macross Frontier
 Ozma, a superboss in Final Fantasy IX
 Ozma, the Ra-seru of thunder in Legend of Legaia
 Ozma, a character in RWBY

Music 
 Ozma (band), a rock band from Pasadena, California
 DJ Ozma, Japanese pop singer
 Ozma (album), a 1989 album by the Melvins

Other uses 
 Project Ozma, a pioneering experiment in the 1960s in the search for extraterrestrial intelligence
 The Ozma problem, a philosophical problem posed in The Ambidextrous Universe by Martin Gardner 
 , a 2012 Japanese anime television series

See also 
 Osma, municipality in Soria, Castile-León, Spain
 Ausma (disambiguation)